CBTK-FM is a Canadian radio station, which broadcasts the programming of the CBC Radio One network in Kelowna, British Columbia. The station broadcasts at 88.9 FM in Kelowna.

History
The station was launched in 1987. Prior to its launch, CBC Radio programming aired in Kelowna on private affiliate CKOV 630 in the AM band, while most of its other transmitters were rebroadcasters of Vancouver's CBU.

Local programming
CBTK produces its own local morning show, Daybreak South with Chris Walker, as well as a local afternoon show, Radio West with Sarah Penton, which airs across the whole interior of British Columbia.

Rebroadcasters

On April 12, 1985, the CRTC approved an application by the CBC to amend the broadcasting licences for CBXH, CBDA and CBKI by changing the frequencies from 1450 to 1540; 1240 to 1560; and 1450 to 1350. These AM transmitters were eventually converted to FM or shutdown.

FM conversions
 On October 13, 2011, CBTK applied to convert CBRD 860 to 97.1 MHz. The application was approved on December 15, 2011. CBRD's callsign was replaced by CBTK-FM-1 once the flip occurred.
 On August 16, 2013, CBTK-FM applied to relocate CBRJ 860 to 107.3 MHz. This application was approved on October 31, 2013.
 On September 23, 2014, the CBC was approved to convert CBUI 740 to 102.5 MHz.
 On September 1, 2017, the CBC applied to convert CBUM to 91.3 MHz. The CRTC approved the CBC's application to convert CBUM from 900 AM to 91.3 FM on November 17, 2017. This was later changed to 99.9 MHz after the CRTC approved the CBC's application to move CBUM-FM from 91.3 MHz to 99.9 MHz on September 18, 2019.

Transmitter closures
On October 25, 2013 at the request of the CBC, the CRTC deleted low-power AM transmitter CBKR 740 in Parson. Also, another low-power AM transmitter CBWD 900 in Donald was deleted. Radio One programming in these communities are available from adjacent transmitters CBUQ-FM and CBXE-FM, the closest Radio One transmitters to Parson and Donald.

Split of CBYK-FM into separate network

CBTK-FM was previously repeated on CBYK-FM Kamloops and on 22 CBC radio repeaters in the Thompson and Cariboo regions. On October 28, 2011, the CBC filed an application with the CRTC to convert CBYK-FM to an anchor of a new regional CBC Radio One network. The CRTC approved the new regional network on March 30, 2012, with a start-up date slated for October 9, 2012.

CBUC-FM, which was originally to have been part of the new network, will remain a repeater of CBTK-FM, following interventions from various parties, including the City of Salmon Arm, that the region is more economically-tied with the Okanagan region than with Kamloops.

Shortly after CBYK-FM's launch as a separate station, residents of Revelstoke complained to the CRTC that they were not consulted by the CBC when they switched their local repeater, CBTO-FM 91.3, to CBYK-FM's programming; e-mails made to the city's mayor's office show that 80% of listeners prefer programming from Kelowna, while only 20% prefer the new Kamloops programming. The CRTC later said that it is up to the CBC to decide which programming originates for CBTO-FM, not the CRTC. After city officials contacted the CBC, BC spokesperson Lorna Haeber said that the CBC would make a decision on the issue "shortly", but failed to elaborate how or when the decision will be made. The CRTC subsequently issued a notice that it had approved an application by the CBC to change the local programming source of its Radio One transmitter in Revelstoke from Kamloops back to Kelowna. The change was implemented on January 2, 2014.

References

External links

 CBC British Columbia
 
 

Btk
Btk
Radio stations established in 1987
1987 establishments in British Columbia